Andrew Price (April 2, 1854 – February 5, 1909) was an American lawyer and politician who served four terms as a U.S. Representative from Louisiana from 1889 to 1897.

Biography 
Born on Chatsworth plantation, near Franklin, St. Mary Parish, Louisiana, Price attended various private schools. He graduated from Cumberland School of Law at Cumberland University, Lebanon, Tennessee, in 1875, and from the Law Department of Washington University in St. Louis in 1877.

He was admitted to the bar and practiced in St. Louis, Missouri until 1880, when he returned to Louisiana and engaged in sugar planting. He was a delegate to the Democratic National Convention in 1888.

Congress 
Price was elected as a Democrat to the Fifty-first Congress to fill the vacancy caused by the death of his father-in-law, Edward James Gay. He was reelected to the Fifty-second, Fifty-third, and Fifty-fourth Congresses and served from December 2, 1889, to March 3, 1897.

He was elected to these positions after participating in the Thibodaux massacre which claimed the lives of up to 300 innocent African Americans.

Price owned Clover Bottom Farm outside Nashville, Tennessee, which he and his wife used primarily as a summer home, and where he raised livestock and thoroughbred horses.

Death and burial 
He died at Acadia Plantation in Thibodaux, Lafourche Parish, Louisiana, on February 5, 1909. He was interred in Mount Olivet Cemetery, Nashville, Tennessee.

References

External links

1854 births
1909 deaths
Washington University School of Law alumni
Samford University alumni
Louisiana lawyers
Cumberland School of Law alumni
Democratic Party members of the United States House of Representatives from Louisiana
19th-century American politicians
People from Franklin, Louisiana
Burials at Mount Olivet Cemetery (Nashville)
Cumberland University alumni
Washington University in St. Louis alumni